Johann Christian Carl Günther (1769 – 1833) was a German botanist, pharmacist, batologist, and author.

References

1769 births
1833 deaths
People from Jawor
People from the Province of Silesia
19th-century German botanists
University of Breslau alumni